Andiamo is the second studio album released by punk band Authority Zero. It was released on June 30, 2004, on Lava Records and includes the single "Revolution" (which is also included on the compilation album Rock Against Bush, Vol. 1) and a cover of the Wall of Voodoo song "Mexican Radio", with small lyrical changes included to include the song as the band's statement against the 2003 invasion of Iraq. The album title is Italian and means, literally, "we go," but can also be translated as "let's go."  The title of the album can be split to read "And I Am 0" ("And I Am Zero"), as seen faintly in the CD insert.  (And) I Am Zero is the name of Authority Zero's live DVD, which was released in 2005. "Revolution" and "Painted Windows" had music videos made.

Track listing
 "Painted Windows" - 3:51
 "Revolution" - 2:25
 "Find Your Way" - 4:15
 "Madman" - 2:58
 "Taking on the World" - 3:48
 "Retreat!" - 4:48
 "Society's Sequence" - 1:17
 "A Thousand Years of War" - 3:15
 "Mexican Radio" - 2:54
 "Chile Con Crudo (Instrumental)" - 1:59
 "Solitude" - 3:47
 "Siempre Loco" - 0:49
 "PCH-82" - 5:36
 "Rattlin' Bog"* - 2:47

Album art
The album's art is a play on Norman Rockwell's "No Swimming" image.

Hidden track
At the end of the album there is a hidden track, "Rattlin' Bog". The track was recorded live at a concert in the band's home state of Arizona and mixed by Erik Toms at SJS Studios in Scottsdale.

References

2004 albums
Authority Zero albums
Lava Records albums
Albums produced by Michael Happoldt
Albums produced by Ryan Greene